José Antonio Páez is one of the 14 municipalities of the state of Yaracuy, Venezuela. The municipality is located in southwestern Yaracuy, occupying an area of 135 km ² with a population of 15,101 inhabitants in 2001. The capital lies at Sabana de Parra. It was named after José Antonio Páez.

References

External links
Official site

Municipalities of Yaracuy